Commander, Pakistan Fleet (COMPAK) is a formal title in the Pakistan Navy to denote the head (usually a two star or three star vice admiral) as the commander of Pakistan Fleet Command with duties sanctioned by the navy for fleet support, progressive transition of the fleet, and ensuring effectiveness of the force. The COMPAK is also assigned with responsibilities to ensure combat and staff capabilities of the fleet such as deployment of the forces, in addition to ensure equipment capacities designed to improve "operational readiness".

The COMPAK is one of the four major administrative authorities and one of the seven total commands of the navy such as Commander, Karachi (COMKAR), a major naval base, Commander, Logistics (COMLOG), Northern Command (COMNOR), Commander, Coast (COMCOAST), Commander Central Punjab (COMCEP), Flag Officer Sea Training (FOST), and the commander fleet itself. The fleet commander heads destroyer squadron, naval aviation, surface warfare, and other surface operations and anti-submarine warfare designed for multiple roles such as equipments, including watercraft, weapons, arms, and naval bases.

Surface and submarine warfare 
25th Destroyer Squadron
18h Destroyer Squadron
5th Subron
Aviation
9th Auxmin
21st Auxiliary Squadron (AUXRON-21)
Auxron 21 Squadron
PNS RAZA
Pakistan Navy Tactical School (PNTS)
PNS Haider
FMG
WATT
MHQ
BEAMER

Appointment style 
When a new head takes the command as COMPAK, it is literary known as "change of command" ceremony held at the official workplace of the commander in Karachi. During the ceremony, a guard of honour is presented to the new head, while the incumbent officer hands over scroll command to the new COMPAK.

List of commanders

References 

Commands of Pakistan Navy